Waimea County was one of the counties of New Zealand on the South Island.

During the period 1853 to 1876, the area that would become Waimea County was administered as part of Nelson Province. With the Abolition of Provinces Act 1876, Waimea County was created, taking over administration of its area in January 1877. The county council's administrative headquarters was located in Richmond. 

Waimea County existed until the 1989 local government reforms, when the Tasman District was formed through the amalgamation of the Waimea County, Golden Bay County, Murchison County and Richmond Borough administrative areas.

References

Counties of New Zealand
Tasman District